Maikel Scheffers (born 7 September 1982) is a Dutch wheelchair tennis player. He plays singles and doubles events. Scheffers was born with spina bifida. He lives in Dorst.

He has won six Grand Slam titles—two in wheelchair singles and four in wheelchair doubles.

Paralympic Games
Scheffers participated in the 2008 Summer Paralympics in Beijing. He won a bronze medal in the wheelchair men singles competition. In the wheelchair men's doubles tournament, he and partner Ronald Vink lost in the bronze medal game to Shingo Kunieda and Satoshi Saida.

Grand Slam performance timelines

Wheelchair singles 

Source: Profile at www.australianopen.com and Profile at 2011.usopen.org

Wheelchair doubles 

Source: Profile at www.australianopen.com and Profile at 2011.usopen.org

References

External links
 Site of Maikel Scheffers 
 
 

1982 births
Living people
Dutch male tennis players
Wheelchair tennis players
Paralympic wheelchair tennis players of the Netherlands
Paralympic bronze medalists for the Netherlands
Paralympic medalists in wheelchair tennis
Medalists at the 2008 Summer Paralympics
Medalists at the 2020 Summer Paralympics
Wheelchair tennis players at the 2008 Summer Paralympics
Wheelchair tennis players at the 2012 Summer Paralympics
Wheelchair tennis players at the 2016 Summer Paralympics
Wheelchair tennis players at the 2020 Summer Paralympics
Australian Open (tennis) champions
Sportspeople from 's-Hertogenbosch
People with spina bifida
ITF number 1 ranked wheelchair tennis players
ITF World Champions
21st-century Dutch people